The Central Fire Station is an historic fire station in Portland, Maine. Built between 1924 and 1925, it is home to the Portland Fire Department. In 2019, Greater Portland Landmarks listed it alongside Portland's other fire stations as "places in peril," though this designation was disputed by a city spokesperson. Adjacent to the building is The Fireman Statue, which was designed and created in 1898 from North Jay granite and located on the property in 1987. Nearby landmarks include Lincoln Park, Portland City Hall, the Press Herald Building, and the Edward T. Gignoux United States Courthouse.

References

Firefighting in Portland, Maine
Buildings and structures in Portland, Maine
Fire stations in Maine
Fire stations completed in 1925
1925 establishments in Maine